Mike Harris (born January 5, 1989) is a former American football cornerback. He was drafted by the Jacksonville Jaguars in the 6th round (176th overall) of the 2012 NFL Draft. He played college football for El Camino College before transferring to Florida State University.

Professional career

Jacksonville Jaguars
Harris recorded both his first quarterback sack and first interception of his NFL career in the same game in a victory over the Tennessee Titans on November 25, 2012. On December 30, he recovered a blocked punt and returned it for a touchdown in a loss to the Titans. Harris was released by the Jaguars on August 24, 2014.

Detroit Lions
On October 8, 2014, the Detroit Lions signed Harris to their practice squad.

New York Giants
On October 29, 2014, the New York Giants signed Harris away from the Lions practice squad. On September 6, 2015, he was waived by the Giants.

References

External links
 
 Florida State Seminoles bio
 Jacksonville Jaguars bio

1989 births
Living people
South Miami Senior High School alumni
Players of American football from Miami
American football cornerbacks
El Camino Warriors football players
Florida State Seminoles football players
Jacksonville Jaguars players
Detroit Lions players
New York Giants players